Urgleptes histrionella is a species of beetle in the family Cerambycidae. It was described by Henry Walter Bates in 1885.

References

Urgleptes
Beetles described in 1885